Petar "Pero" Dujmović (born November 14, 1977 in Mostar, SFR Yugoslavia) is Croatian basketball agent, businessman and former pro basketball player.

Basketball career 
Dujmović started playing at Zrinjski. In 1996 he moved to Zagreb team KK Zrinjevac. After five seasons he moved to Israel team Hapoel Galil Elyon, before in 2002 he signed with Euroleague team Union Olimpija. After one year with Olimpija, he signed with Fenerbahçe Ülker, but in November 2003 he moved back to Ljubljana. He also played for Charleoi, Cholet, Cedevita and HKK Široki. His career ended after an Achilles' heel injury.

Post-basketball 
In 2009 he established basketball agency Pepi Sport Agency, that covers players in Bosnia&Herzegovina, Croatia and Slovenia. 
He is also director of fashion shop Locker.

References

External links 
 Pepi Sport Agency
 LinkedIn Profile
 LNB Profile

1977 births
Living people
ABA League players
Croatian men's basketball players
Basketball players from Mostar
KK Olimpija players
Fenerbahçe men's basketball players
Spirou Charleroi players
KK Cedevita players
HKK Široki players
KK Zrinjevac players
Forwards (basketball)